Frailty is a common geriatric syndrome that embodies an elevated risk of catastrophic declines in health and function among older adults. Frailty is a condition associated with ageing, and it has been recognized for centuries. It is also a marker of a more widespread syndrome of frailty, with associated weakness, slowing, decreased energy, lower activity, and, when severe, unintended weight loss. Frailty has been identified as a risk factor for the development of dementia.

As a population ages, a central focus of geriatricians and public health practitioners is to understand, and then beneficially intervene on, the factors and processes that put elders at such risk, especially the increased vulnerability to stressors (e.g. extremes of heat and cold, infection, injury, or even changes in medication) that characterizes many older adults.

Geriatric syndromes related to frailty

Sarcopenia

Sarcopenia is the degenerative loss of skeletal muscle mass, quality, and strength associated with aging. The rate of muscle loss is dependent on exercise level, co-morbidities, nutrition and other factors. Sarcopenia can lead to reduction in functional status and cause significant disability from increased weakness. The muscle loss is related to changes in muscle synthesis signalling pathways although is incompletely understood. The cellular mechanisms are distinct from other types of muscle atrophy such as cachexia, in which muscle is degraded through cytokine-mediated degradation although both conditions may co-exist.

Osteoporosis

Osteoporosis is an age-related disease of bone that leads to an increased risk of fracture. In osteoporosis the bone mineral density (BMD) is reduced, bone microarchitecture is disrupted, and the amount and variety of proteins in bone is altered. Osteoporosis is defined by the World Health Organization (WHO) in women as a bone mineral density 2.5 standard deviations below peak bone mass (20-year-old healthy female average) as measured by DXA; the term "established osteoporosis" includes the presence of a fragility fracture.

Osteoporosis is most common in women after menopause, when it is called postmenopausal osteoporosis, but may also develop in men, and may occur in anyone in the presence of particular hormonal disorders and other chronic diseases or as a result of medications, specifically glucocorticoids, when the disease is called steroid- or glucocorticoid-induced osteoporosis (SIOP or GIOP). Given its influence in the risk of fragility fracture, osteoporosis may significantly affect life expectancy and quality of life.

Muscle weakness
Muscle weakness, also known as muscle fatigue, (or "lack of strength") refers to the inability to exert force with one's skeletal muscles. Weakness often follows muscle atrophy and a decrease in activity, such as after a long bout of bedrest as a result of an illness. There is also a gradual onset of muscle weakness as a result of sarcopenia – the age-related loss of skeletal muscle.

A test of strength is often used during a diagnosis of a muscular disorder before the etiology can be identified. Such etiology depends on the type of muscle weakness, which can be true or perceived as well as variable topically. True weakness is substantial, while perceived rather is a sensation of having to put more effort to do the same task. On the other hand, various topic locations for muscle weakness are central, neural and peripheral. Central muscle weakness is an overall exhaustion of the whole body, while peripheral weakness is an exhaustion of individual muscles. Neural weakness is somewhere between.

Smurfness 
Recent findings suggest that the end-of-life is molecularly and physiologically highly stereotyped, evolutionarily conserved and predictable. The Smurf phenotype "is a dramatic increase of intestinal permeability that can be observed in vivo using a non-invasive assay. The proportion of individuals showing that phenotype increases quasi linearly as a function of chronological age and every individual will undergo this change prior to death from non-pathological causes, in other words ‘occurring during normal aging’".

Biological and physiological mechanisms
It has been suggested that the causes of frailty are multifactorial, involving dysregulation across many physiological systems.  A proinflammatory state, sarcopenia, anemia, relative deficiencies in anabolic hormones (androgens and growth hormone) and excess exposure to catabolic hormones (cortisol),  insulin resistance,  glucose levels, compromised altered immune function, micronutrient deficiencies  and oxidative stress are each individually associated with a higher likelihood of frailty. Additional findings show that the risk of frailty increases with an increased number of abnormal bodily systems. This finding shows that interventions that target multiple systems may yield greater results in prevention and treatment of frailty than interventions that target only one system.

Associations between specific disease states are also associated with and frailty have also been observed, including cardiovascular disease, diabetes mellitus, chronic kidney disease and other diseases in which inflammation is prominent. It is possible that clinically measurable disease states can manifest themselves or be captured prior to the onset of frailty. No single disease state is necessary and sufficient for the pathogenesis of frailty, since many individuals with chronic diseases are not frail. Therefore, rather than being dependent on the presence of measurable diseases, frailty is an expression of a critical mass of physiologic impairments. 
Frailty has been identified as a risk factor for the development of dementia.

Theoretical understanding
Recent work on frailty has sought to characterize both the underlying changes in the body and the manifestations that make frailty recognizable.  It is well-agreed upon that declines in physiologic reserves and resilience is the essence of being frail.  Similarly, scientists agree that the risk of frailty increases with age and with the incidence of diseases. Beyond that, there is now strong evidence to support the theory that the development of frailty involves declines in energy production, energy utilization and repair systems in the body, resulting in declines in the function of many different physiological systems.  This decline in multiple systems affects the normal complex adaptive behavior that is essential to health   and eventually results in frailty typically manifesting as a syndrome of a constellation of weakness, slowness, reduced activity, low energy and unintended weight loss. When most severe, i.e. when 3 or more of these manifestations are present, the individual is at a high risk of death.

Frailty assessment

The syndrome of geriatric frailty is hypothesized to reflect impairments in the regulation of multiple physiologic systems, embodying a lack of resilience to physiologic challenges and thus elevated risk for a range of deleterious endpoints.  Generally speaking, the empirical assessment of geriatric frailty in individuals seeks ultimately to capture this or related features, though distinct approaches to such assessment have been developed in the literature (see de Vries et al., 2011 for a comprehensive review).

Two most widely used approaches, different in their nature and scopes, are discussed below. Other approaches follow.

Physical frailty phenotype
A popular approach to the assessment of geriatric frailty encompasses the assessment of five dimensions that are hypothesized to reflect systems whose impaired regulation underlies the syndrome.  These five dimensions are: 
 unintentional weight loss, 
 exhaustion, 
 muscle weakness, 
 slowness while walking, and 
 low levels of activity.
Corresponding to these dimensions are five specific criteria indicating adverse functioning, which are implemented using a combination of self-reported and performance-based measures.  Those who meet at least three of the criteria are defined as "frail", while those not matching any of the five criteria are defined as "robust".  Additional work on the construct is done by Bandeen-Roche et al. (2006), though some of the exact criteria and measures differ (see Table 1 in the paper for this contrast).  Other studies in the literature have also adopted the general approach of Linda P. Fried et al. (2001) though, again, the exact criteria and their particular measures may vary.  This assessment approach was developed and refined by Fried and colleagues at the Johns Hopkins University's Center on Aging and Health. This center is home to Johns Hopkins Claude D. Pepper Older Americans Independence Center, which focuses on frailty research and has launched a website dedicated to frailty science: https://frailtyscience.org.

Frailty index / Deficit accumulation
Another notable approach to the assessment of geriatric frailty (if not also to some degree its conceptualization) is that of Rockwood and Mitnitski (2007) in which frailty is viewed in terms of the number of health "deficits" that are manifest in the individual, leading to a continuous measure of frailty (see Rockwood, Andrew, and Mitnitski (2007) for a contrast of the two approaches).  This approach was developed by Dr. Rockwood and colleagues at Dalhousie University.

Four domains of frailty
A four domains of frailty model was proposed in response to an article in the BMJ.  This conceptualisation could be viewed as blending the phenotypic and index models.  Researchers tested this model for signal in routinely collected hospital data, and then used this signal in the development of a frailty model, finding even predictive capability across 3 outcomes of care. In the care home setting, one study indicated that not all four domains of frailty were routinely assessed in residents, giving evidence to suggest that frailty may still primarily be viewed only in terms of physical health.

SHARE Frailty Index
The SHARE-Frailty Index (SHARE-FI) was originally developed by Romero-Ortuno (2010) and researchers as part of the Survey of Healthy Ageing and Retirement in Europe. It consists of five domains of the frailty phenotype:
Fatigue
Loss of appetite
Grip strength
Functional difficulties
Physical activity

The SHARE-FI calculator is freely available to use online.  The calculator classifies individuals as:
 frail
 pre-frail
 non-frail / robust

The SHARE-FI has good clinical utility as it provides relatively quick assessment of frailty in often time-poor healthcare settings.

Prevention

Identification of risk factors 
When considering prevention of frailty, it is important to understand the risk factors that contribute to frailty and identify them early on. A 2005 observational study found associations between frailty and a number of risk factors such as: low income, advanced age, chronic medical conditions, lack of education, and smoking.

Exercise 
A significant target in the prevention of frailty is physical activity. As people age, physical activity markedly drops, with the steepest declines seen in adolescence and continuing on throughout life. The lower levels of physical activity and are associated with and a key component of frailty syndrome. Therefore, exercise regimens have been examined in a number of studies as an intervention to prevent frailty. A randomized control trial published in 2017 found significantly lower rates of frailty in older adults who were assigned an exercise regimen vs those who were in the control group. In this study, 15.3% of the control group became frail in the time frame of the study, in comparison to 4.9% of the exercise group. The exercise group also received a nutritional assessment, which is another target in frailty prevention.

Nutrition 
Nutrition has also been a major target in the prevention of frailty. A 2019 review paper examined a variety of studies and found evidence of nutritional intervention as an effective way of preventing frailty. With the mediterranean diet in particular reducing risk of frailty up to 60%.

Non-surgical management

Exercise 
Individuals partaking in exercise appear to have potential in preventing frailty. In 2018, a systemic review concluded that group exercise had the benefit of delaying frailty in older adults aged 65 and above. Elderly adults are also less likely to sustain fall injuries.

Occupational therapy 
Activities of daily living (ADLs) include activities that are necessary to sustain life. Examples are brushing teeth, getting out of bed, dressing oneself, bathing, etc. Occupational therapy provided modest improvements in elderly adults mobility to do ADLs.

Nutritional supplementation 
Frailty can involve changes such as weight loss. Interventions should focus on any difficulties with supplementation and diet. For those who may be undernourished and not acquiring adequate calories, oral nutritional supplements in between meals may decrease nutritional deficits.

With age comes decreased bone density. Therefore, vitamin D supplementation may provide the benefits of improving stability and muscle strength retention.

Palliative care 
Palliative care may be helpful for individuals who are experiencing an advanced state of frailty with possible other co-morbidities. Improving quality of life by reducing pain and other harmful symptoms is the goal with palliative care. One study showed the cost reduction by focusing on palliative care rather than expensive treatments that may be unnecessary and unhelpful.

Surgical outcomes
Frail elderly people are at significant risk of post-surgical complications and the need for extended care.  Frailty more than doubles the risk of morbidity and mortality from surgery and cardiovascular conditions. Assessment of older patients before elective surgeries can accurately predict the patients' recovery trajectories. 
The most widely used frailty scale consists of five items:
unintentional weight loss >4.5 kg in the past year
self-reported exhaustion
<20th population percentile for grip strength
slowed walking speed, defined as lowest population quartile on 4-minute walking test
low physical activity such that persons would only rarely undertake a short walk
A healthy person scores 0; a very frail person scores 5. Compared to non-frail elderly people, people with intermediate frailty scores (2 or 3) are twice as likely to have post-surgical complications, spend 50% more time in the hospital, and are three times as likely to be discharged to a skilled nursing facility instead of to their own homes. Frail elderly patients (score of 4 or 5) have even worse outcomes, with the risk of being discharged to a nursing home rising to twenty times the rate for non-frail elderly people.

Epidemiology and public health
Frailty is a common geriatric syndrome. Estimates of frailty prevalence in older populations may vary according to a number of factors, including the setting in which the prevalence is being estimated – e.g., nursing home (higher prevalence) vs. community (lower prevalence) – and the operational definition used for defining frailty. Using the widely used frailty phenotype framework proposed by Fried et al. (2001), prevalence estimates of 7–16% have been reported in non-institutionalized, community-dwelling older adults.

The occurrence of frailty increases incrementally with advancing age, is more common in older women than men, and among those of lower socio-economic status.  Frail older adults are at high risk for major adverse health outcomes, including disability, falls, institutionalization, hospitalization, and mortality.

Epidemiologic research to date has led to the identification of a number of risk factors for frailty, including: (a) chronic diseases, such as cardiovascular disease, diabetes, chronic kidney disease, depression, and cognitive impairment; (b) physiologic impairments, such as activation of inflammation and coagulation systems, anemia, atherosclerosis, autonomic dysfunction, hormonal abnormalities, obesity,  hypovitaminosis D in men, and environment-related factors such as life space and neighborhood characteristics.  Advances about potentially modifiable risk factors for frailty now offer the basis for translational research effort aimed at prevention and treatment of frailty in older adults. A recent systematic review found that exercise interventions can increase muscle strength and improve physical function; however, results are inconsistent in frail older adults living in the community.

A review looked at the relationship between the frailty syndrome and chronic lower extremity ischemia in those people with diabetes. On the one hand, chronic lower limb ischemia may predispose to the development of frailty, on the other hand, the presence of the frailty may affect the prognosis in patients with peripheral arterial disease.

Ongoing clinical trials 
As of September 2021, ongoing clinical trials on frailty syndrome in the US include:

 the impact of frailty on clinical outcomes of patients treated for abdominal aortic aneurysms
 the use of "pre-habilitation," an exercise regimen used before transplant surgery, to prevent the frailty effects of kidney transplant in recipients
 defining the acute changes in frailty following sepsis in the abdomen
 the efficacy of the anti-inflammatory drug, Fisetin, in reducing frailty markers in elderly adults
 Physical Performance Testing and Frailty in Prediction of Early Postoperative Course After Cardiac Surgery (Cardiostep)
Up-to-date information on ongoing clinical trials on frailty syndrome and other conditions can be found at clinicaltrials.gov.

References 

Geriatrics
Gerontology